Josimar Dias (born 3 June 1986), known as Vozinha, is a Cape Verdean professional footballer who plays as a goalkeeper for AS Trenčín.

He played for clubs in his own country, Angola, Moldova, Portugal and Cyprus. A full international with over 50 caps for Cape Verde since 2012, he played at the Africa Cup of Nations in 2013, 2015 and 2021.

Club career
Born in Mindelo on the island of São Vicente, Cape Verde, Vozinha began his career at local Batuque FC, playing for them until 2011 before moving to local city rivals CS Mindelense. Following good showings with the club, he was signed by Progresso Associação do Sambizanga in Angola. He made a return to Mindelense in 2013 and played in the São Vicente Island League.

After a year at FC Zimbru Chișinău in Moldova, Vozinha moved in August 2016 to Gil Vicente F.C. of the Portuguese second tier.

International career
Vozinha made his debut for Cape Verde on 8 September 2012 in a 2013 Africa Cup of Nations playoff first leg at home to Cameroon, a 2–0 win. He remained in goal for the second leg in Yaoundé on 14 October, a 2–1 loss that saw his country qualify for their first major tournament. At the finals in South Africa, the team reached the quarter-finals before a 2–0 loss to Ghana; he conceded the second goal after going up the pitch in the dying seconds to attack a corner kick.

Vozinha also played at the 2015 Africa Cup of Nations. On 7 October 2020, he earned his 50th cap in a 2–1 friendly win away to Andorra, and a year later he was called up for the 2021 Africa Cup of Nations in Cameroon.

Honours
AEL Limassol
Cypriot Cup: 2018–19

Personal
His younger brother Delmiro was also a Cape Verde international.

References

External links
 
 

1986 births
Living people
People from Mindelo
Cape Verdean footballers
Association football goalkeepers
CS Mindelense players
Cape Verde international footballers
Cape Verdean expatriate footballers
Expatriate footballers in Angola
Cape Verdean expatriate sportspeople in Angola
2013 Africa Cup of Nations players
Batuque FC players
2015 Africa Cup of Nations players
FC Zimbru Chișinău players
Expatriate footballers in Moldova
Cape Verdean expatriate sportspeople in Moldova
Gil Vicente F.C. players
Expatriate footballers in Portugal
Cape Verdean expatriate sportspeople in Portugal
Liga Portugal 2 players
AEL Limassol players
Expatriate footballers in Cyprus
Cape Verdean expatriate sportspeople in Cyprus
Cypriot First Division players
AS Trenčín players
Expatriate footballers in Slovakia
Cape Verdean expatriate sportspeople in Slovakia
Slovak Super Liga players
2021 Africa Cup of Nations players